The Guibourd House, also known as La Maison de Guibourd, is an example of poteaux-sur-solle (vertical post on sill or foundation) sealed with bouzillage (usually a mixture of clay and grass) construction. The structure was built around 1806 and was the home of Jacques Jean Rene Guibourd and his family.

The basic architecture of the Guibourd House is very similar to other Creole-French structures around the town and throughout the French inhabited regions of the Illinois Country/territory, eastern Canada and the Louisiana territory.

The structure's design has been changed only slightly over the years to accommodate the needs of the various residents, but overall retains much of the original character and style of the early 19th century French Creole architecture. The house had originally been built with 'galleries' (or wide porches) surrounding the house to keep the interior cool in the summer and the snow off in the winter.

The slave quarters or kitchen was added a few years later. The kitchen building was made of brick and detached from the main house due the added heat of cooking during the summer months, the smoke associated with cooking that would linger on cloth furnishings, and finally, because the French considered the smell of cooking to be offensive. (Contrary to the myth that kitchens were separate from the house due to the dangers of fire in the food preparation areas, extensive research has been done on the subject with no substantial facts to back it up. Refer to the book Death by Petticoat, by Mary Theobald, Colonial Williamsburg Press.) The Guibourd kitchen was built in a semi-attached fashion, under one corner of the porch. This proved invaluable for the family and slaves when serving meals to be able to keep them hot, dry and timely. The Guibourd House has one of the few original kitchen structures and slave quarters of this time period in Ste. Genevieve.

The Guibourd House is a contributing property in the Ste. Genevieve Historic District, which is a National Historic Landmark. The house is operated as a historic house museum by the Foundation for Restoration of Ste. Genevieve, Inc.

Jacques Jean-René Guibourd de Luzinais

 Born: 29 July 1755
 Where: Candé, France
 Father: Christopher Ambroise Guibourd
 Mother: Renée Maguerite Gibault
 Spouse: Ursule (Ursula) Barbeau
(Sister-in-Law to Jean-Baptiste Valle)
 Married: 24 June 1800
 Family: (all born in Ste. Genevieve)
 Eugene Jacques Pierre Guibourd (3 May 1801 – 16 June 1879)
 Infant Guibourd (died: 21 Nov 1803 [from church burial records])
 Jean Edward [Eduart] Guibourd (born: unknown) [died: 9 Jan 1805]
 Omer François Guibourd (born: 23 Oct 1807 - died: October 12, 1874 in  La-Corbiere, France)
 Jules Joseph Marie Guibourd (born: 9 Nov 1811 - died: unknown in France)
 Died: 29 May 1812
 Where: Ste. Genevieve, Missouri
 Buried: Ste. Genevieve Memorial Cemetery

From Candé to Sainte Genevieve

Jacques came to Ste. Genevieve from France by way of Saint Domingue where he had been a secretary to a wealthy plantation owner. During a slave rebellion, he was smuggled out of the country in a cargo barrel by his slave, Moros.

He and Moros made their way back to France whereupon seeing the chaos and destruction there caused by the Reign of Terror (1793–94, just after the French Revolution of 14 July 1789) had decided to leave their homeland. After hearing of a population of French speaking settlers (possibly Royalist (Chouannerie) or those loyal to King Louis XVI) in America from someone headed to Philadelphia, he and Moros decided to sail to America. There is some evidence that Jacques and Moros were shipwrecked during that voyage and that resulted in the two losing all their belongings. It has been noted that when Jacques arrived in Ste. Genevieve, Missouri sometime in the late 1790s, he was penniless.

There is documentation noting that Ursula's father, Jean-Baptiste Barbeau, took in Jacques (and presumably Moros) until he could get settled. This resulted in his meeting his future wife, Ursula in addition to becoming acquainted with Jean-Baptiste Valle, the Commandant of Ste. Genevieve (in the Illinois Territory, Upper Louisiana).

In 1799, he obtained a Spanish land grant for the entire block (2 arpents X 2 arpents, 1 arpent = 192 feet) on which his house currently stands. While the house was being built, Jacques opened a mercantile and sold goods to villagers from his residence just across the street from La Maison de Guibourd. Copies of his merchant's ledger shows what he sold, to whom, how much the items cost and how the items were paid for.

 In June 1800 he married Ursula Barbeau and quickly became involved in the affairs of the town. He served as a judge on the territorial district court and was a Commissioner of Rates and Levies for the Ste. Genevieve District. He was also one of the original trustees of the 1808 Ste. Genevieve Louisiana Academy, the first institute of higher education west of the Mississippi River.

In addition to being a merchant, Jacques owned a tan-yard (or tannery) just a few miles South of town on the River aux Vases, and owned a lead mine located west of town in what is now Washington County, MO.

Jacques' son, Eugene, married Marie Therese St. Gemme Beauvais and had 12 children most of whom were born in Old Mines, Washington County, MO.

Jacques died 29 May 1812. After Ursula died on October 20, 1843, the south half of the property and the house was inherited by sons Jules and Omer. The northern half was inherited by their son, Eugene who had moved back to Ste. Genevieve just four years earlier in 1839.

At age 11, Eugene's son, Felix, traveled with his uncles, Jules and Omer Guibourd back to Angers, France. There, he obtained his degree in science and art, and attended medical school in Paris. Felix returned to Ste. Genevieve in 1865 where he practiced medicine until his death in 1885.

In 1859 according to the HABS survey, Jules and Omer sold their part of the lot to Eugene and it subsequently became the property of his son, Felix. In 1907, the property was sold to Clovis G. Boyer who in turn sold the house to Jules Felix and Anne Marie Vallé. In January, 1973, Anne Marie's will left the house to the Foundation for Restoration of Ste. Genevieve.

Further reading
 Naeger, Bill, Patti Naeger, and Mark Evans.  Ste. Genevieve: A Leisurely Stroll through History. Ste. Genevieve: Merchant Street, 1998.

See also

 Louisiana (New France)
 Louisiana Purchase
 Illinois Country
 Ohio Country
 New France
 New Spain
 French in the United States
 Timeline of New France history
 Three Flags Day
 A few acres of snow
 French colonization of the Americas
 French colonial empire
 List of North American cities founded in chronological order
 Sainte Geneviève
 List of commandants of the Illinois Country
 Historic regions of the United States

References

External links

 La Maison de Guibourd webpage
 Foundation for Restoration of Ste. Genevieve, Inc. Guibourd Historic House & Mecker Research Library
 Felix Vallé State Historic Site Missouri Department of Natural Resources
 Ste. Genevieve Co, MO Historical and Genealogical Resources
 Sainte Genevieve Chamber of Commerce
 Ste. Genevieve Herald
 French Creole Architecture Louisiana Dept Natural Resources

Creole architecture in the United States
French-American culture in Missouri
Houses on the National Register of Historic Places in Missouri
Historic house museums in Missouri
Houses completed in 1806
Museums in Ste. Genevieve County, Missouri
Historic district contributing properties in Missouri
New France
French colonial architecture
French-Canadian culture in Missouri
Missouri culture
Houses in Ste. Genevieve County, Missouri
National Register of Historic Places in Ste. Genevieve County, Missouri
Slave cabins and quarters in the United States